Mitrović is a Serbian surname, derived from the male given name Mitar (a version of the Slavic name Dimitar or Dimitrije). It may refer to:

Aleksandar Mitrović (basketball) (born 1990), Serbian professional basketball player
Aleksandar Mitrović (footballer) (born 1994), Serbian professional footballer
Aleksandar Mitrović (politician) (1933–2012), former Deputy Prime Minister of Yugoslavia
Aleksandar Mitrović (volleyball) (born 1982), Serbian volleyball player 
Branislav Mitrović (born 1985), Serbian water polo player
Dalibor Mitrović (born 1977), Serbian football striker
Dejan Mitrović (born 1973), retired Serbian football player
Draženko Mitrović (born 1979), Paralympian athlete from Serbia
Janko Mitrović (died 1659), Serbian military commander in Venetian service
Lazar Mitrović (footballer, born 1993), Serbian footballer
Lazar Mitrović (footballer, born 1998), Serbian footballer
Luka Mitrović (born 1993), Serbian basketball player
Marko Mitrović (footballer, born 1978), Serbian football coach
Marko Mitrović (footballer, born 1992), Swedish footballer
Matej Mitrović (born 1993), Croatian football player
Milan Mitrović (born 1988), Serbian football player
Milorad Mitrović (footballer, born 1908) (1908–1993), Serbian football defender
Milorad Mitrović (footballer, born 1949), Serbian professional football coach and player
Milorad Mitrović (poet) (1867–1907), Serbian poet
Nenad Mitrović (footballer, born 1980), Serbian footballer
Nenad Mitrović (footballer, born 1998), Serbian football goalkeeper
Nikola Mitrović (born 1987), Serbian footballer
Radovan Mitrović (born 1992), footballer
Romeo Mitrović (born 1979), Bosnian Croat football player
Slaviša Mitrović (born 1977), Bosnian Serb football player
Srećko Mitrović (born 1984), Australian football player of Serbian descent
Stefan Mitrović (footballer, born 1990), Serbian footballer
Stefan Mitrović (footballer, born January 2002), Serbian footballer
Stefan Mitrović (footballer, born August 2002), Serbian-Canadian footballer
Stefan Mitrović (water polo) (born 1988), Serbian water polo player
Žika Mitrović (1921–2005), Serbian and Yugoslav film director and screenwriter
Wratislaw of Mitrovice, Bohemian noble family

See also
Mitrinović
Meštrović
Mitrovica (disambiguation)
Mitrovtsi

Serbian surnames
Patronymic surnames
Surnames from given names